Matthias Lange (born 14 February 1963) is a German former cyclist. He competed in the team pursuit event at the 1988 Summer Olympics.

References

External links
 

1963 births
Living people
German male cyclists
Olympic cyclists of West Germany
Cyclists at the 1988 Summer Olympics
Cyclists from Lower Saxony
People from Schaumburg